Shameful Behavior? is a 1926 American silent romantic comedy film directed by Albert H. Kelley and starring Edith Roberts, Richard Tucker and Martha Mattox. It is based on a 1910 short story of the same name by Marie Belloc Lowndes.

Synopsis
After going out to Paris a plain Jane and returning a fashionable flapper,  Daphne Carrol sets out to woo the man she loves, her sister's brother-in-law. A series of mix-ups and a mistaken newspaper report leads him to believe that his "new" woman he has met is an escaped lunatic.

Cast
 Edith Roberts as Daphne Carrol
 Richard Tucker as Jack Lee
 Martha Mattox as Mrs. Calhoun
 Harland Tucker as Custis Lee
 Grace Carlyle as Joan Lee
 Louise Carver as Sally Long
 Hayes E. Robertson as The Butler

References

Bibliography
 Connelly, Robert B. The Silents: Silent Feature Films, 1910-36, Volume 40, Issue 2. December Press, 1998.
 Munden, Kenneth White. The American Film Institute Catalog of Motion Pictures Produced in the United States, Part 1. University of California Press, 1997.

External links
 

1926 films
1926 comedy films
1920s English-language films
American silent feature films
Films based on short fiction
Silent American comedy films
Films directed by Albert H. Kelley
American black-and-white films
Preferred Pictures films
Flappers
1920s American films